This is a list of direct armed conflicts involving the Philippines since its founding during the Philippine revolution. This excludes battles widely regarded to be part of a larger war and isolated military engagements.

List
Legend

Spanish colonial era
Wars involving the Philippines from the Philippine Revolution until the United States take over of the Philippine archipelago.

American colonial era
Wars involving the United States-administered Philippines until July 4, 1946.

Cold War era
Wars involving the Philippines from July 4, 1946 until the end of the Cold War era in 1991.

Contemporary era
Wars involving the Philippines from the end of the Cold War era in 1991 to present.

Notes

References

External links
 Wars of the Philippines

 
Philippines
Wars
Wars